Alocolytoceratinae is a subfamily of lytoceratids that comprises genera characterized by many deep constrictions in the shell  resulting in capricorn-like (goat's horm) ornamention, especially in the middle whorls, but becoming smooth and more involute in the outer whorls. Saddle endings in the suture tend to be phylloid, (leaf-like).

Alcolytocerainae includes Alocolytoceras, Lobolytoceras, Pachylytocras, and Pleurolytoceras, which are mostly from the Toarcian. One genus, Pachylotoceras, extends into the lower Bajocian.

References
Notes

Bibliography
W.J.Arkell, B.Kummel, & C.W.Wright 1957. Mesozoic Ammonoidea, Treatise on Invertebrate Paleontology, Part L Ammonoidea. R.C.Moore, (ed).

Early Jurassic ammonites
Toarcian first appearances
Middle Jurassic extinctions
Middle Jurassic ammonites
Lytoceratidae